The Homeland Harmony Quartet was an American gospel group founded in 1935.

The original lineup of the quartet was Otis Leon McCoy, Doyle Blackwood, Fred Calvin Maples, and B.C. Robinson. The group had lasting ties to the Church of God and went through more than fifty line-up changes in a career that spanned thirty years.

In 1943, tenor Connor Brandon Hall joined the quartet. He would remain with the group until his death in 1992. Other notables to sing with the group include basses Big Jim Waits and Johnny Atkinson, Lee Roy Abernathy and baritone James McCoy.  The line-up of Hall, Abernathy, J. McCoy,  Shorty Bradford, and A.D.Soward that formed in 1947 is widely considered to have been  a seminal influence on both pop and further gospel musical stylings.

Personnel

TENOR
Connor Hall 1942-1989

LEAD
Otis McCoy 1942-1944
Shorty Bradford 1946-1948, 1953-1954
Paul Stringfellow 1948-1950
Bobby Shaw 1950-1952, 1987-1989
Wayne Groce 1952-1953
Harold Lane 1954-1955
Jim Cole 1955-1956
Tommy Rainer 1956-1957
Fred Elrod 1957-1958, 1963-1987

BARITONE 
James McCoy 1942-1958
Jimi Hall 1963-1969
JL Steele 1969-1986

BASS
BC Robinson 1942-1943
Big Jim Waits 1943-1944, 1949-1952
John Hamrick 1946-1947
Aycel Soward 1947-1949, 1953-54, 1955
Johnny Atkinson 1952-1953
London Parris 1954
George Younce 1955
Rex Nelon 1955-1958
Bill Curtis 1963-1989

PIANO 
Hovie Lister 1942-1944
Lee Roy Abernathy 1946-1948, 1953-1954
Reece Crockett 1948-1949
Wally Varner 1949-1950, 1951-1953
Doy Ott 1950-1951
Randy Jones 1954-1955
Jack Clark 1955-1956, 1969-1989

References

External links
Overview of Homeland Harmony Quartet

American gospel musical groups
Gospel quartets
Musical groups established in 1935
Southern gospel performers